INS Varsha is a new naval base being developed under Project Varsha for the Indian Navy. This base will be the home of the navy's new fleet of nuclear submarines and ships. It was planned to be located within a radius of approximately 200 kilometres (124.27 statute miles) from Visakhapatnam, the headquarters of the navy's Eastern Naval Command. Previous news reports suggested that Gangavaram had been the initial site for the new base. The base is now being developed at Rambilli, which is 50 km from Visakhapatnam.

Construction
INS Varsha would de-congest the Visakhapatnam Port, which is used by both the navy and the civilian Ministry of Shipping. The navy's dockyards at Vizag are facing shortage of berthing space due to the rapid expansion of the Eastern fleet, which grew from 15 major warships in 2006 to 46 in 2012, and is still expanding. Varsha will have a large near-by facility of the Bhabha Atomic Research Centre (BARC), and will include modern nuclear engineering support facilities and extensive crew accommodation. It is designed to support the fleet of 8-12 nuclear-powered ballistic missile and attack submarines to be built for the Indian Navy. It will also have underground pens to hide the submarines from spy satellites and protect them from enemy air attacks. The navy is seeking foreign technical assistance pertaining to nuclear safety features for the base. While designed principally as a nuclear submarine support facility, the new base can accommodate other naval vessels because of the Indian Navy's expansion. This facility has been compared to the top-secret Hainan nuclear submarine base for the Chinese PLA Navy. This east coast base expansion programme by the Indian Navy was started due to India's Look East policy and the Chinese naval expansion into the region.

In addition to Project Varsha, in late 2009, the Hindustan Shipyard Limited (HSL), located at Visakhapatnam, was transferred from the Ministry of Shipping to the Ministry of Defence in order to support the Arihant-class nuclear submarine construction programme. These new vessels will be based at INS Varsha.

It was reported that the Central government has diverged 670 hectares of forest land in Rambilli, Andhra Pradesh to Project Varsha which was needed to house a strategic technical area and a command and control centre. This was required for the Phase-II of the project. Construction of Phase-I was reported to be on full swing. It was also reported that the Bhabha Atomic Research Centre is constructing a research and development complex just 20 km away from the Project Varsha site at Atchutapuram that will support the submarine base. About 845 hectares had already been handed over to BARC for the new facility.

Phase-I of the project will be completed by 2022.

See also
Yulin Naval Base - a Chinese base for nuclear submarines.
INS Kadamba
INS Satavahana
INS Vajrabahu

References

Varsha